Euclase is a beryllium aluminium hydroxide silicate mineral (BeAlSiO4(OH)). It crystallizes in the monoclinic crystal system and is typically massive to fibrous as well as in slender prismatic crystals. It is related to beryl (Be3Al2Si6O18) and other beryllium minerals. It is a product of the decomposition of beryl in pegmatites.

Euclase crystals are noted for their blue color, ranging from very pale to dark blue. The mineral may also be colorless, white, or light green. The ready cleavage renders the crystals fragile with a tendency to chip, and thus detracts from its use for personal ornament. When cut, it resembles certain kinds of beryl and topaz, from which it may be distinguished by its specific gravity (3.1). Its hardness (7.5) is similar to beryl (7.5 - 8), and a bit less than that of topaz (8).
It was first reported in 1792 from the Orenburg district in the southern Urals, Russia, where it is found with topaz and chrysoberyl in the gold-bearing gravels of the Sanarka (nowadays probably, Sakmara River, Mednogorsk district, Orenburgskaya Oblast'). Its type locality is Ouro Prêto, Minas Gerais, Southeast Region, Brazil, where it occurs with topaz. It is found rarely in the mica-schist of the Rauris in the Austrian Alps.

References

Nesosilicates
Beryllium minerals
Monoclinic minerals
Minerals in space group 14